Warren Township is one of thirteen townships in Putnam County, Indiana. As of the 2010 census, its population was 3,929 and it contained 566 housing units.

History
The Putnamville Presbyterian Church was listed on the National Register of Historic Places in 1984.

Geography

Cities and towns
 Cloverdale (partial)

Unincorporated towns
 Cradick Corner at 
 Jenkinsville at 
 Putnamville at 
 Westland at 
(This list is based on USGS data and may include former settlements.)

References

External links
 Indiana Township Association
 United Township Association of Indiana

Townships in Putnam County, Indiana
Townships in Indiana